"The Wall Street Shuffle" is a single by the British pop/rock band 10cc, released in 1974 on the UK Records label, from the band's 1974 album Sheet Music. It was the most successful single to be released from the album, reaching No. 10 on the UK chart.

The song features a classic rock riff and lyrics that deal with Wall Street and the economy. It features several topical cultural references and specifically mentions Getty, Rothschild and Howard Hughes.

Record World said that this "economic dance lesson [is] sure to break the clever British band top 40."

Track listing

7" vinyl

Personnel
For "The Wall Street Shuffle":
 Eric Stewart – lead guitar, vocals, electric piano, grand piano, Mellotron, organ
 Lol Creme – rhythm guitar
 Graham Gouldman – bass, acoustic guitar, rhythm guitar, percussion
 Kevin Godley – drums, percussion

Chart performance

Weekly charts

Year-end charts

Covers
ABBA singer Anni-Frid Lyngstad recorded a Swedish version called "Guld och gröna ängar" ("Gold and Green Meadows" with Swedish lyrics by Owe Junsjö) on her solo album Frida ensam (1975).

References

10cc songs
1974 singles
Songs written by Graham Gouldman
Songs written by Eric Stewart
UK Records singles
1974 songs